Jesper de Jong and Vitaliy Sachko were the defending champions but only Sachko chose to defend his title, partnering Vladyslav Manafov.

Sachko successfully defended his title after defeating Corentin Denolly and Adrián Menéndez Maceiras 6–1, 6–4 in the final.

Seeds

Draw

References

External links
 Main draw

Almaty Challenger II - Doubles